Thomas Porter (February 15, 1734 – May 30, 1833) was a Connecticut and Vermont military and political figure who served as Speaker of the Vermont House of Representatives.

Biography
Thomas Porter was born in Farmington, Connecticut Colony, on February 15, 1734 and became a farmer in Cornwall.  He served with the British during the French and Indian War and held several local offices, including member of the Connecticut House of Representatives.

Porter served against the British at the start of the American Revolution as a captain in the Connecticut Militia, and relocated to Tinmouth, Vermont in 1779.

In 1780 Porter was elected to the Vermont House of Representatives.  He served until 1782 and was Speaker of the House during his entire House tenure.

Porter resigned as Speaker to accept election to the Governor's Council, on which he served until 1795.

From 1781 to 1782 Porter was Assistant Judge of the Rutland County Court, and he was the court's Chief Judge from 1788 to 1789.

In 1783 Porter became a Judge on the Vermont Supreme Court, serving until 1785.

He died in Granville, New York on May 30, 1833. Porter was buried at Sawyer Cemetery in Tinmouth.

Porter was the father of college president and theologian Ebenezer Porter.

References

1734 births
1833 deaths
People from Farmington, Connecticut
People from Tinmouth, Vermont
People of Connecticut in the French and Indian War
People of Connecticut in the American Revolution
People of colonial Connecticut
Members of the Connecticut House of Representatives
Members of the Vermont House of Representatives
Speakers of the Vermont House of Representatives
Justices of the Vermont Supreme Court
People of pre-statehood Vermont
Military personnel from Connecticut
People from Cornwall, Connecticut